Amirabad Rural District is a rural district (dehestan) in Muchesh District, Kamyaran County, Kurdistan Province, Iran. As of the 2006 census, its population was 7,330, in 1,727 families. The rural district has 24 villages.

References 

Rural Districts of Kurdistan Province
Kamyaran County